is a Japanese manga artist, cartoonist and illustrator of novels born on February 27, 1968, in Kanagawa Prefecture, Japan. She is famous for her best-selling manga series Zetsuai 1989, which is considered to have redefined the Shōnen-ai/Yaoi genres in the late 1980s/early 1990s. She sometimes uses other pseudonym—.

In 1988 (at the age of 20), her first manga series, Chūsei no Akashi (Proof of Loyalty), was serialized in Margaret Comics.

Her success with Zetsuai 1989 has led Helen McCarthy to describe Ozaki as "one of the queens of shojo and shonen-ai manga". Through her Captain Tsubasa dojinshi, Ozaki "played a strong role" in "revamping the boys-love genre" in the 1980s.  Her hallmark is "prolonged erotic psychodramas" which has earned her a "cult following" through Margaret.  Matt Thorn describes her as being a "mania-oriented" artist, with "extremely stylized" character designs and page layouts with a "dream-like quality". Her style had an enormous influence on later shōjo writers.

List of works
 Chūsei no Akashi, 1988
 3 Days, 1989
 Zetsuai 1989, 1989
 Bad Blood, 1992
 Bronze: Zetsuai Since 1989, since 1991
 Devil Children, 2011

Dōjinshi 
Since 1984 Minami Ozaki has published many yaoi dōjinshi. The biggest circles are:
 NTT
 Calekka
 Club Doll
 Kreuz

References

External links
 Official website (Japanese)
 

Women manga artists
Japanese female comics artists
Living people
1968 births
Manga artists from Kanagawa Prefecture